Chandanapally is a village and Gram panchayat of Nalgonda mandal, Nalgonda district, in Telangana state'''.

References

Villages in Nalgonda district